Sandra Schultz (born 19 January 1964) is a South African actress, presenter, and fashion designer. Her films include Door to Silence (1992), Assignment (2015), While You Weren't Looking (2015), and Call Me Thief (2016). On television, she is known for her roles in Binnelanders (2005–2015), Die Spreeus (2019), Trackers (2019), the Netflix series Blood & Water (2020–), and Diepe Waters (2022). Schultz is also known for her theatre work, earning a Vita Award nomination.

Her clothing line is called Sass Designs.

Early and personal life
Schultz was born in Johannesburg and grew up in Cape Town. She attended Alexander Sinton Secondary School. She went on to graduate from the University of Cape Town in 1986.

Schultz moved to Topanga, California in 1991, where she lived for twelve years and was married to American actor John Savage from 1993 until their divorce in 2003. She returned to South Africa in 2005 and later married Laszlo Bene. Bene passed away in May 2020; the couple had been together for almost 16 years.<ref>{{Cite web|url=https://www.netwerk24.com/huisgenoot/bekendes/sandi-schultz-se-seer-nog-vlak-na-man-sterf-n-ware-liefdesverhaal-eindig-nooit-20211217|title=Sandi Schultz se seer nog vlak ná man sterf: n Ware liefdesverhaal eindig nooit'|journal=Huisgenoot|first=Colin|last=Hendricks|date=17 December 2021|accessdate=25 November 2022|lang=af}}</ref>

Schultz has opened up about having been raped when she was 28 and the health issues she experienced in the aftermath. She founded Slutwalk Johannesburg, and her chosen charity on Survivor'' was the Rape Crisis Cape Town Trust.

Filmography

Film

Television

Stage

Awards and nominations

References

External links
 
 Sandi Schultz at TVSA
 Sandi Schultz at Fig Jam Agency
 Cyber Sass Blog

Living people
1964 births
20th-century South African actresses
21st-century South African actresses
Actresses from Cape Town
Actresses from Johannesburg
Coloured South African people
Sexual abuse victim advocates
University of Cape Town alumni